Fu Shin Estate is a mixed TPS and public housing estate in Tai Po, New Territories, Hong Kong, built on the reclaimed land of Tai Po Hoi. It consists of six residential blocks built in 1985. Some of the flats were sold to tenants through Tenants Purchase Scheme Phase 6B in 2005.

Ming Nga Court and Yee Nga Court are Home Ownership Scheme housing courts in Tai Po near Fu Shin Estate, built in 1985 and 1993 respectively.

History

Lift plunge incident
On 25 October 2008, a lift at Shin Nga House, Fu Shin Estate suddenly plunged 14 storeys, but no one was injured. This raised concerns on lift safety. The government later confirmed the incident was caused by the failure of the counterweight pulley bearing, which caused the dislodgement of all eight suspension ropes from the counterweight.

Houses

Fu Shin Estate

Ming Nga Court

Yee Nga Court

Demographics
According to the 2016 by-census, Fu Shin Estate had a population of 14,583, Ming Nga Court had a population of 4,168 while Po Nga Court had a population of 4,841. Altogether the population amounts to 23,592.

Politics
For the 2019 District Council election, the estate fell within two constituencies. Most of the estate and Yee Nga Court are located in the Yee Fu constituency, which was formerly represented by Yam Kai-bong until July 2021, while the remainder of the estate and Ming Nga Court falls within the Fu Ming Sun constituency, which was formerly represented by Kwan Wing-yip until July 2021.

See also

Public housing estates in Tai Po

References

Tai Po
Public housing estates in Hong Kong
Tenants Purchase Scheme
Residential buildings completed in 1985
Housing estates with centralized LPG system in Hong Kong